UFC 87: Seek and Destroy was a mixed martial arts event held by the Ultimate Fighting Championship on August 9, 2008, at the Target Center in Minneapolis, Minnesota.  It is the twenty-first UFC event for the Pay-Per-View broadcast in high-definition.

Background
The card was headlined by a welterweight championship bout between champion Georges St-Pierre and challenger Jon Fitch.

UFC Hall of Famer Mark Coleman was first scheduled to fight Brock Lesnar, but an Achilles tendon injury forced him to withdraw. Heath Herring stepped in to fight Lesnar instead.

Future UFC Light Heavyweight Champion Jon Jones made his UFC debut at this event after stepping in to replace Tomasz Drwal who pulled out of his bout with Andre Gusmao due to injury.

Results

Bonus awards
At the end of the night, the UFC awarded $60,000 to each of the fighters who received one of these three awards.

Fight of the Night: Georges St-Pierre vs. Jon Fitch
Knockout of the Night: Rob Emerson
Submission of the Night: Demian Maia

See also
 Ultimate Fighting Championship
 List of UFC champions
 List of UFC events
 2008 in UFC

References

External links
UFC 87 Fight Card
Official UFC 87 Site
Sherdog Results o

Ultimate Fighting Championship events
2008 in mixed martial arts
Events in Minneapolis
Mixed martial arts in Minnesota
Sports competitions in Minneapolis
2008 in sports in Minnesota